Anne Johns (born 1981) is a Scottish born Australian international lawn bowler.

Bowls career

Asia Pacific Championships
Johns won a fours gold medal with Natasha Scott, Kelsey Cottrell and Carla Krizanic and a triples silver medal with Scott and Krizanic at the 2015 Asia Pacific Bowls Championships in New Zealand.

National
In 2018 she won the pairs title with Kelsey Cottrell, at the Australian National Bowls Championships and won the title again 2022 with Samantha Ferguson. In 2021, she won her 8th Australian Open crown, this time in the fours.

References

Living people
1981 births
Australian female bowls players
Scottish female bowls players